Montier Township is an inactive township in Shannon County, in the U.S. state of Missouri.

Montier Township was erected in 1901, taking its name from the community of Montier, Missouri.

References

Townships in Missouri
Townships in Shannon County, Missouri